Media Park may  refer to:

 Media Park (Hilversum, Netherlands)
 Media Park (Los Angeles, California)

See also

 MediaPark (Cologne, Germany)